Bandwagon was an Australian television variety series, which aired on Melbourne station HSV-7 from 1959 to 1960.

Produced by Joy Youlden, the series aired live on Tuesdays at 9:30PM. 

Performers on the series included Michael Cole, Graeme Bent, Heather Horwood, Joy Grisold, Diana Bell, Judy Banks and Judd Laine. 

The 3 September 1959 edition of The Age compared the series unfavourably to its main competition, the popular In Melbourne Tonight on GTV-9. The writer for the newspaper felt that although the cast of Bandwagon were "quite adaptable to the TV medium", they were let down by the scripts and music choices.

References

External links

Seven Network original programming
1959 Australian television series debuts
1960 Australian television series endings
Australian variety television shows
Black-and-white Australian television shows
English-language television shows
Australian live television series